The 2001 FIS Ski Jumping Grand Prix was the 8th Summer Grand Prix season in ski jumping on plastic. Season began on 11 August 2001 in Hinterzarten, Germany and ended on 9 September 2001 in Hakuba, Japan.

Calendar

Men

Standings

Overall

After 7 events.

Nations Cup

After 7 events.

See also
 World Cup 2001/02

References

Grand Prix
FIS Grand Prix Ski Jumping